Gǔwén or Ku-wen (古文 "ancient writing") may refer to:
 one of the two additional forms included in the Shuowen Jiezi, an ancient Chinese dictionary
 Chinese characters, ancient forms
 Chinese bronze inscriptions
 Oracle bone script
 Seal script
 Old Texts, versions of Chinese classics held to have been transcribed from recovered manuscripts
 Classical Chinese, the language of the classic literature of ancient China
 Classical Chinese grammar
 Classical Prose Movement of the Tang and Song dynasties in China
 Guwen Guanzhi, an anthology of essays written in literary Chinese